John James Gow (born 4 October 1859) was a Scottish footballer who played as a defender.

Career
Born in Glasgow, Gow played club football for Queen's Park, and made one appearance for Scotland in 1885.

References

1859 births
Year of death missing
Scottish footballers
Scotland international footballers
Queen's Park F.C. players
Association football defenders
Footballers from Glasgow
Place of death missing
FA Cup Final players